La Coste is a city in Medina County, Texas, United States. The population was 1,119 at the 2010 census. It is part of the San Antonio Metropolitan Statistical Area.

Geography

Demographics

2020 census

As of the 2020 United States census, there were 1,077 people, 632 households, and 500 families residing in the city.

2000 census
As of the census of 2000, there were 1,255 people, 416 households, and 338 families residing in the city. The population density was 1,954.0 people per square mile (757.1/km2). There were 466 housing units at an average density of 725.6/sq mi (281.1/km2). The racial makeup of the city was 79.60% White, 1.43% African American, 1.20% Native American, 0.40% Asian, 14.02% from other races, and 3.35% from two or more races. Hispanic or Latino of any race were 51.63% of the population.

In 2000 La Coste was the place in the United States with the highest percentage of its population reporting Alsatian ancestry, with 7.1% of the population reporting Alsatian ancestry.

There were 416 households, out of which 40.9% had children under the age of 18 living with them, 58.9% were married couples living together, 17.8% had a female householder with no husband present, and 18.8% were non-families. 16.6% of all households were made up of individuals, and 6.7% had someone living alone who was 65 years of age or older. The average household size was 3.01 and the average family size was 3.37.

In the city, the population was spread out, with 31.5% under the age of 18, 8.8% from 18 to 24, 30.0% from 25 to 44, 18.2% from 45 to 64, and 11.5% who were 65 years of age or older. The median age was 32 years. For every 100 females, there were 95.5 males. For every 100 females age 18 and over, there were 93.7 males.

The median income for a household in the city was $36,786, and the median income for a family was $39,342. Males had a median income of $25,750 versus $19,773 for females. The per capita income for the city was $13,199. About 8.5% of families and 13.5% of the population were below the poverty line, including 20.9% of those under age 18 and 10.4% of those age 65 or over.

Education
The City of La Coste is served by the Medina Valley Independent School District.

References 

Cities in Texas
Cities in Medina County, Texas
Greater San Antonio